"Outposts of tyranny" was a term used in 2005 by United States Secretary of State Condoleezza Rice and subsequently by others in the U.S. government to characterize the governments of certain countries as being totalitarian regimes or dictatorships. In addition to specifically identifying Belarus, Cuba, Iran, Myanmar, North Korea, and Zimbabwe as examples of outposts of tyranny, Rice characterized the broader Middle East as a region of tyranny, despair, and anger.

Usage
In addition to using the expression "outposts of tyranny" in a 2005 written submission to the United States Senate Committee on Foreign Relations, Rice provided details to characterize "a fear society" in her prepared remarks before the Senate Foreign Relations Committee on January 18, 2005:

Rice went on to identify Belarus, Burma, Cuba, Iran, North Korea and Zimbabwe as examples of outposts of tyranny. Other governments were implicitly criticized in her remarks by being part of the broader Middle East:

Reactions
The government of North Korea took strong exception to the label, declaring that it would not return to six-party talks on the Korean nuclear weapons crisis until the United States apologized. On June 21, 2005, U.S. Under Secretary of State for Democracy and Global Affairs Paula Dobriansky used the term during a speech for the Hudson Institute: "North Korea, Burma, Zimbabwe and Cuba are outposts of tyranny." In response, the North Korean deputy ambassador to the United Nations, Han Song-ryol, stated, "Resuming the six-party talks would be possible if there is restraint on the part of the U.S. from using the words 'outpost of tyranny' for one month." South Korean Foreign Minister Ban Ki-moon was concerned over the implications for inter-Korean relations: "It is regrettable for a high U.S. official to call North Korea an 'outpost of tyranny', which is not good for the two Koreas' efforts to have a reconciliatory atmosphere."

Similarly, South African President Thabo Mbeki, who had attempted to effect a conciliatory attitude to neighboring Zimbabwe by avoiding public criticism of the record of President Robert Mugabe, was displeased. "It's an exaggeration and whatever the U.S. government wants to do with that list of six countries, or however many, it's really somewhat discredited."

Some commentators have accused the U.S. of double standards in relation to the application of the "outposts of tyranny" tag since the named countries were limited to those routinely criticized by the U.S. State Department in its annual Country Reports on Human Rights Practices and the International Religious Freedom Report. For example, Amitabh Pal of The Progressive wrote that as Rice specifically refrained from applying the term to such states as Saudi Arabia, Equatorial Guinea, and Azerbaijan, it suggested that the administration had ulterior motives for its human rights pronouncements, which are "heavily subordinate to U.S. strategic and economic interests".

The Washington Post has published a series of forums and interviews pertaining to the countries which Rice chose as being examples of outposts of tyranny.

Comparison to other state classifications and political neologisms
The State Department has not used the term "outposts of tyranny" officially.

See also
 Axis of evil
 Evil Empire speech
 Failed state
 Rogue state
 State-sponsored terrorism
 State Sponsors of Terrorism (U.S. list)
 Troika of tyranny
 United States sanctions

References

External links
 Opening Statement by Dr. Condoleezza Rice (pdf format)
 At-a-glance: 'Outposts of tyranny' - BBC News - January 19, 2005
 Excerpts: Condoleezza Rice - BBC News - January 18, 2005
 2004 Country Reports on Human Rights Practices
 2004 International Religious Freedom Report

American political neologisms
American political catchphrases
2005 neologisms